The 1914 season was the third season for Santos Futebol Clube, a Brazilian football club, based in the Vila Belmiro bairro, Zona Intermediária, Santos, Brazil.

References

External links
Official Site 

Santos
1914
Santos